The 2003 Columbia Lions football team was an American football team that represented Columbia University during the 2003 NCAA Division I-AA football season. Columbia finished sixth in the Ivy League. 

In their first season under head coach Bob Shoop, the Lions compiled a 4–6 record and were outscored 283 to 211. Rashad Biggers, Chris Carey and Jeff Roether were the team captains.  

The Lions' 3–4 conference record placed sixth in the Ivy League standings. Columbia was outscored 189 to 135 by Ivy opponents. 

Columbia played its homes games at Lawrence A. Wien Stadium in Upper Manhattan, in New York City.

Schedule

References

Columbia
Columbia Lions football seasons
Columbia Lions football